Urmston Musical Theatre (UMT) is an amateur theatre company based in Urmston, Greater Manchester, UK.

History
The organisation was formed in 1911 as the Urmston and District Operatic Society, and produced H.M.S. Pinafore at the Urmston Public Hall. In 1947, the name was changed to the Urmston Amateur Operatic Society which remained until it assumed the current name.

Several well-known personalities have been connected with the society, notably the current President, Matthew Kelly, who appeared in the society's 1963 production of The King and I along with Peter Pennington, who became a featured soloist with the Black and White Minstrels. Others include Brian Trueman who appeared in the group's production of Merrie England in 1951, the late Lord Winstanley and Winston Churchill MP, grandson of the wartime leader and son of Randolph Churchill MBE.

In 1958, 1959 and 1960, the society won the Manchester Evening News Prompter's Palm award for their productions of Carousel, Oklahoma! and Magyar Melody respectively. The society has also been nominated in the Manchester Musical Awards on a number of occasions for both overall and individual performances. In 1995, they won the "Best Musical" award for their production of Camelot.

Junior members aged between 8 years and 18 years, in addition to being involved in some of the main shows and pantomimes, have presented a variety of musicals in their own right since 1993 including The Wizard of Oz, Bugsy Malone, Andy Capp, Copperfield, and Dazzle.

In the early 1930s, the theatre almost closed when reserves fell to £3, but for the enthusiasm and dedication of its members and patrons.

Past presidents and shows

References

External links
 Official website

Buildings and structures in Trafford
Amateur theatre companies in England
Performing groups established in 1911
Organisations based in Trafford